Oscar Cove is a cove next west of Garzon Point in southern Paradise Harbor, Danco Coast, Graham Land. The cove was named "Caleta Oscar" by the Argentine Antarctic Expedition, 1949–50, from the forename of the second-in- command of the expedition ship Chiriguano used in survey of the area.

Coves of Graham Land
Danco Coast